Wiehahn Jovan Herbst (born 5 July 1988) is a South African rugby union player for the Tel Aviv Heat in Rugby Europe Super Cup.

On 28 March 2014 it was announced Herbst had signed a three-year contract with Ulster.

References

External links

itsrugby.co.uk Profile

1988 births
Living people
South African rugby union players
Sharks (Currie Cup) players
Sharks (rugby union) players
Afrikaner people
People from Klerksdorp
Rugby union props
South Africa Under-20 international rugby union players
South African expatriate rugby union players
Expatriate rugby union players in Northern Ireland
South African expatriate sportspeople in Northern Ireland
Ulster Rugby players
Bulls (rugby union) players
Blue Bulls players
Lions (United Rugby Championship) players
Golden Lions players
Rugby union players from North West (South African province)
Tel Aviv Heat players
South African expatriate sportspeople in Israel
Expatriate rugby union players in Israel